Palmares is a city in northeastern Brazil, in the State of Pernambuco, with 63,500 inhabitants, according with IBGE 2020. Its main activity is the combined field of agriculture and livestock. It received its name from the Portuguese people who named it that due to the number of palm trees in the area where run-away slaves had created approximately 16 quilombos, led by Zumbi.

Geography

 State - Pernambuco
 Region - Zona da mata Pernambucana
 Boundaries - Bonito  (N); Xexéu  (S);  Catende (W);  Joaquim Nabuco and Água Preta  (E)
 Area - 386.84 km2
 Elevation - 108 m
 Hydrography - Una river
 Vegetation - Subperenifólia forest
 Climate - Hot tropical and humid
 Annual average temperature - 22 c
 Distance to Recife - 120 km

Economy

The main economic activities in Palmares are based in industry, commerce and agribusiness especially, sugarcane, bananas; and creations of cattle, horses and mules.

Economic Indicators

Economy by Sector
2006

Health Indicators

See also
Palmares (quilombo)
Quilombo
Zumbi

References

Municipalities in Pernambuco